İnönü is a town and district of Eskişehir Province in the Central Anatolia region of Turkey. According to 2009 census, population of the district is 7,228 of which 3,980 live in the town of İnönü.

History
During the western front (also known as the Greco-Turkish War (1919–22) of the Turkish War of Independence in 1921, the First and Second Battles of İnönü took place near the town between the Turkish and the Greek forces. The battles were named after the town, and İsmet İnönü, the Turkish commanding officer during the battles and future President and Prime Minister of Turkey, was given his surname in honor of his services during the battles.

Before it became a district in 1987, İnönü belonged to Söğüt district of Bilecik Province in 1922. Afterwards, it became part of Bozüyük district in 1926 and central district of Eskişehir Province in 1963. İnönü was a township center until 1987.

Notes

References

External links
 District municipality's official website 
 Map of İnönü district

Towns in Turkey
Populated places in Eskişehir Province